This list comprises all players who have played for Orlando City SC which dates from their inaugural Major League Soccer season in 2015 to present. Players who were acquired by the team but were not available to play in matches (e.g. selected in a draft but not signed or acquired in a trade but immediately traded away) are not listed.

A "†" denotes players who did not appear in a single match but were available for fixtures.

A "‡" denotes players who also played for Orlando City in USL Pro before their expansion to MLS.

Bolded players are currently under contract by Orlando City SC.

Stats include all competitive matches (MLS, MLS Cup Playoffs, MLS is Back Tournament, U.S. Open Cup, CONCACAF Champions League, etc.) .

All stats accurate as of match played March 18, 2023.

Players

Outfield players

Goalkeepers

By nationality 
MLS regulations allow for eight international roster slots per team to be used on non-domestic players. However, this limit can be exceeded by trading international slots with another MLS team. Overseas players are exempt from counting towards this total if they have permanent residency rights in the U.S. (green card holder), other special dispensation such as refugee or asylum status, or qualify under the Homegrown International Rule. In total, 123 players representing 34 different countries have played for Orlando City.

Note: Countries indicate national team as defined under FIFA eligibility rules. Players may hold more than one non-FIFA nationality.

References

Sources
By Season | MLSsoccer.com

Orlando City SC
 
Association football player non-biographical articles